Stygiinae is a subfamily of the family Cossidae (carpenter or goat moths).

Genera
 Neostygia Wiltshire, 1980
 Stygia Latreille, [1802]

References 
 , 1943.  Sobre a nomenclatura de alguns grupos superiores da ordem Lepidoptera. la. nota : super-famílias Castnioidea, Hepialoidea, Saturnioidea e Stygioidea. Papéis Avulsos do Departamento de Zoología Secretar. da  Agric., Sao Paulo. 3(17): 237-255.
 , 2000.  “Fauna lepidopterologica Volgo-Uralensis" 150 years later: changes and additions. Part 2. Bombyces and Sphinges (Insecta, Lepidoptera). Atalanta (Würzburg), 31 (1/2): 265-292. [p. 275: Stygiidae]
 , 2012 List of the hitherto recorded pterygot taxa of Turkey (Insecta) (Temporary report of the Entomofauna Project of Turkey-10). Cent. Ent. Stud., Memoirs 6: i-iv+ 1-1649, 1 fig. [p. 4: Stygiidae Newman, 1832 as syn. of Cossidae Leach, [1815]]. 
 , 1832.  Monographia Aegeriarum Angliae.  The Entomological Magazine, 1: 66-84. 
 , 1990: A Phylogenetic study on Cossidae (Lepidoptera: Ditrysia) based on external adult morphology. Zoologische Verhandelingen 263: 1-295. [p. 14: Stygiidae Newman, 1832] Full article: .
 , 1866.  List of the specimens of Lepidopterous Insects in the Colleclion of the British Museum. Part., 35(suppl.- Part.5): 1847 [p. 1847: Stygiidae Newman, 1832] 
 , 2011. Stygiinae Yakovlev, subfam. n., a new Subfamily of Palaearctic Carpenter-moths (Lepidoptera: Cossidae). Entomological Review 91 (4): 508-512.

External links
Natural History Museum Lepidoptera generic names catalog

 
Cossidae
Moth subfamilies